Bafatá Airport  is an airport serving Bafatá in Guinea-Bissau.  The dirt runway doubles as Av. Brasil and may have vehicular traffic.

See also
Transport in Guinea-Bissau
List of airports in Guinea-Bissau

References

 Google Earth

External links
 OurAirports - Bafatá
 OpenStreetMap - Bafatá

Airports in Guinea-Bissau
Bafatá